Loveland High School can refer to:

Loveland High School (Colorado)
Loveland High School (Ohio)